The George Howard Jr. Federal Building and United States Courthouse is a federal government building at 100 East 8th Street in Pine Bluff, Arkansas.  It is a roughly square building, three stories in height, with a steel frame and curtain glass exterior.  Single-story brick sections project to the east and west of its main block, and the south side houses the building's service entrances.  It was completed in 1967, and is a prominent local example of Modern architecture.  It is also a significant local example of an urban renewal project; it was built in a swampy area previously occupied by "substandard housing".  It was named in honor of Pine Bluff native George Howard Jr. in 2008, and continues to house Pine Bluff's main post office as well as federal courts.

The building was listed on the National Register of Historic Places in 2001.

See also

National Register of Historic Places listings in Jefferson County, Arkansas

References

Buildings and structures completed in 1967
Buildings and structures in Pine Bluff, Arkansas
National Register of Historic Places in Pine Bluff, Arkansas
Courthouses on the National Register of Historic Places in Arkansas
Post office buildings on the National Register of Historic Places in Arkansas